Joseph Anton von Simbschen (6 October 1746 – 14 January 1820) served in the Austrian army during the War of the First Coalition as a staff officer in Italy. He rose in rank to general officer and fought at Loano, Limburg, and Neuwied. During the War of the Second Coalition in 1799 he led the Austrian forces at Amsteg in Switzerland and later earned promotion to Feldmarschall-Leutnant. He led a division during the German campaign in 1800. His actions at Caldiero in 1805 earned him the Order of Maria Theresa. Simbschen was seen as a braggart and loudmouth, qualities which earned him many enemies. When his friend Archduke Charles, Duke of Teschen resigned from the army in 1809, Simbschen's enemies pounced; he was court-martialed, cashiered, and sentenced to house arrest in 1813. The Aulic War Council imposed a harsher prison sentence in 1815, but in 1818 his military rank and awards were restored.

References

1746 births
1820 deaths
18th-century Bohemian people
Austrian generals
Austrian Empire military leaders of the French Revolutionary Wars
Austrian Empire commanders of the Napoleonic Wars
Austrian lieutenant field marshals
Knights Cross of the Military Order of Maria Theresa